The white-throated jay (Cyanolyca mirabilis), also known as the Omiltemi jay, is a species of bird in the family Corvidae.
It is endemic to the Sierra Madre del Sur ranges of Mexico.

Its natural habitat is subtropical or tropical moist montane forests.
It is threatened by habitat loss.

References

External links
BirdLife Species Factsheet.

white-throated jay
Endemic birds of Western Mexico
white-throated jay
Taxonomy articles created by Polbot
Birds of the Sierra Madre del Sur